Abdelkader Salhi may refer to:
 Abdelkader Salhi (footballer)
 Abdelkader Salhi (serial killer)